Rock Steady is the fifth studio album by American rock band No Doubt, released on December 11, 2001, by Interscope Records. The band began writing the album with initial recording sessions in Los Angeles and San Francisco, then traveled to London and Jamaica to work with various performers, songwriters, and producers. Sly & Robbie, the Neptunes, and William Orbit were among the many artists the band collaborated with on the album.

As a result of these collaborations, Rock Steady touches on many musical styles, focusing on electropop, dancehall, and new wave. The band attempted to capture the vibe of Jamaican dancehall music, and experimented with writing songs without its standard instrumentation. Lead vocalist Gwen Stefani wrote her lyrics quickly in comparison to previous records, and dealt with topics ranging from partying to ruminations on her relationship with Gavin Rossdale.

Rock Steady received mostly positive reviews from critics, and was nominated for Best Pop Vocal Album at the 2003 Grammy Awards. The album was a commercial comeback for the band, surpassing sales of their previous album Return of Saturn (2000). Rock Steady spawned four singles, two of which won the Grammy Award for Best Pop Performance by a Duo or Group with Vocal. Rolling Stone ranked Rock Steady number 316 on its 2003 list of "The 500 Greatest Albums of All Time".

Background and production
Every night on the tour to support their 2000 album Return of Saturn, No Doubt threw after-show parties where people danced to Jamaican dancehall music. During a discussion over dinner in late 2000, the band members decided they wanted to explore dancehall-style rhythms for their next album. Drawing inspiration from artists such as Bounty Killer, Cutty Ranks, and Mr. Vegas, the band began work on the album in January 2001 by creating beats on Pro Tools at guitarist Tom Dumont's apartment. The group often tried recreating beats from other song files on the computer, which resulted in modified versions of the original rhythms. They worked with producer Philip Steir at Toast Studios in San Francisco during this time, where the beginnings of "Hey Baby" emerged. When writing lyrics for previous albums, Stefani typically read works by Sylvia Plath that would make her depressed "or find different words that inspire me." In contrast, for Rock Steady she wrote the lyrics quicker and on the spot to meet the goal of writing a song a day. Many of the demos recorded during these early sessions were used in the final tracks, rather than completely reworking the songs. The band saw this as a way to preserve the "initial spark" from when the songs were conceived.

The next month, Stefani left Los Angeles for London to visit boyfriend Rossdale, and the band traveled with her to finish recording "Detective". There, they worked with Eurythmics member David A. Stewart and wrote the song "Underneath It All" in only 10 minutes. In March, No Doubt traveled to Jamaica, staying at the Blue Lagoon in Port Antonio. The band "spent most of the time swimming and getting sunburned and drinking and smoking and recording a little music", according to Dumont. The group would often have Red Stripe beers or rum and cokes with jerk food for breakfast; on one occasion, Dumont passed out from heavy drinking while recording a track. They began work in the mid-afternoon and worked into the night, with an after-party following the session. The group collaborated with Sly & Robbie, who produced "Underneath It All" and "Hey Baby" and brought in dancehall toasters Lady Saw and Bounty Killer, and Steely & Clevie, who produced "Start the Fire".

The band returned from Jamaica and resumed work in June 2001, collaborating with producers Nellee Hooper and Timbaland. The Timbaland track, titled "It's a Fight", and a Dr. Dre-produced song titled "Wicked Day" were excluded from the album because their hip hop sounds did not work well on the album. The band then worked with producer and former Cars frontman Ric Ocasek in late June. Stefani commented that No Doubt worked with so many people for the record because none were available for the time needed to make an LP, but that she would have liked to work with Ocasek longer. The band and its A&R manager Mark Williams chose collaborators based on how well they thought the person would fit the personality of the song that No Doubt had written. In late August, the band returned to London for Mark "Spike" Stent to polish off the songs with audio mixing.

Music and lyrics
The band members often did not play their standard instruments when working on the songs for Rock Steady. As a result, the album's instrumentation contains less guitar and bass guitar than the band's previous work. Many of the album's sounds come from electronic keyboard effects, which bassist Tony Kanal called "Devo-y bleeps and Star Wars noises". Dumont commented that many of the effects came from being unfamiliar with the equipment and "just twiddling knobs". Dumont created an effect similar to that of an echo chamber by placing a microphone inside a metal garbage can with the can's open end facing a drum kit. Richard B. Simon of MTV News asserted that the sound of Rock Steady was part of the decade nostalgia of the 1980s retro movement.

Stefani's vocals range from innocent to seductive, sometimes transitioning from one to the other within a song. Her lyrics are based on her relationship with Rossdale, whom she married less than a year after the album's release. Stefani is openhearted and unreserved as on Return of Saturn, but her approach becomes more immediate and instinctive. The lyrics are more youthful than those on Return of Saturn and detail partying and feelings of lust. An overarching theme on the album is Stefani's impatience in the couple's long-distance relationship. She discusses wanting to see Rossdale on "Making Out" and "Waiting Room", and she reveals her distrust in Rossdale on "In My Head". On "Hey Baby" she gives an innocuous account of the debauchery between her bandmates and their groupies during parties, as she observes the party. The lyrics of "Underneath It All" question whether or not Rossdale is a good match for her, an issue resolved in the chorus, which was written based on a journal entry where Stefani wrote the line "You're lovely underneath it all" about Rossdale.

Composition
Musically, Rock Steady incorporates electropop, dancehall, and new wave. The album maintains many of the styles present in No Doubt's previous work, while introducing influences from the music of Jamaica. "Hey Baby", "Underneath It All" and "Start the Fire" all feature dancehall and ragga, an electronic-oriented subgenre, as well as guest toasters. The latter, written using backward string samples, also contains the band's traditional ska and reggae sounds. Ocasek produced the new wave-influenced tracks "Don't Let Me Down" and "Platinum Blonde Life", the former of which was described as sounding "more like the Cars than the Cars". "Platinum Blonde Life" was so strongly influenced by the Cars' work that Kanal apologized to Ocasek, though Ocasek apologized back that he had not seen the similarity. The synth-pop ballad "Running" was composed on a Yamaha keyboard purchased for Kanal in the 1980s and drew inspiration from the Thompson Twins. Its simple keyboard riff drew comparisons to the work of Depeche Mode, Erasure, and Yazoo.

Because of the number of collaborations, the album touches on several other styles. "Waiting Room", a song written and sung with Prince for Return of Saturn, evokes his R&B style over a drum and bass beat. "Hella Good", an electro-rock song co-written with hip hop production duo the Neptunes, is inspired by the funk songs of the late 1970s such as Queen's "Another One Bites the Dust" and the Commodores' "Brick House". William Orbit, best known for his work on Madonna's electronica-oriented 1998 album Ray of Light, incorporates trance music in the production of "Making Out". "Detective", one of the five tracks produced by Hooper, takes slight influence from pop music. The album's title track closes the album by tying together the many musical themes. It is a slow dub song, with acid house-style bleeps and moans.

Release and promotion
"Hey Baby" was released as the lead single from Rock Steady on October 29, 2001. The song peaked number at five on the Billboard Hot 100, while reaching the top five in New Zealand and the United Kingdom, and the top 10 in Australia, Denmark, Finland, Germany, and Norway. The positive response to "Hey Baby" from radio stations and video channels prompted the band to push forward the release of Rock Steady from December 18 to December 11. The album's second single, "Hella Good", was released on April 13, 2002, reaching number 13 on the Billboard Hot 100. It also charted at number eight in Australia and number 12 in the UK.

"Underneath It All" was released as the third single on August 15, 2002. It became No Doubt's highest-peaking single in the US to date, reaching number three on the Billboard Hot 100. Internationally, the single saw limited success, reaching number eight in New Zealand, number 18 in the UK and number 28 in Australia. "Running" was released as the album's fourth and final single on July 1, 2003. Peaking at number 62, "Running" became the band's lowest-peaking single on the Billboard Hot 100 to date.

Following the success of the standard edition, two reissues of Rock Steady—a limited edition and a special edition—were released in October 2002, each of which including a bonus disc. The limited edition, released in North America, features acoustic live performances of "Underneath It All" and "Just a Girl" recorded at 1LIVE in Cologne, Germany, in June 2002, as well as the music video for "Underneath It All". The special edition, released in Europe, includes a remix of "Hey Baby" featuring Outkast and Killer Mike and another remix by F.A.B.Z.; Roger Sanchez's remix of "Hella Good", which won a Grammy Award for Best Remixed Recording, Non-Classical in 2003; and a remix of Return of Saturns lead single "Ex-Girlfriend" by Philip Steir, who helped produce "Hey Baby". The songs from the two-song bonus disc were released through North American iTunes Stores, and those from the four-song bonus disc were released in other countries. Rock Steady Live, a live DVD of No Doubt performing in 2002 in support of Rock Steady, was released in November 2003.

Critical reception

Rock Steady received generally positive reviews from music critics. At Metacritic, which assigns a normalized rating out of 100 to reviews from mainstream publications, the album received an average score of 69, based on 15 reviews. Rolling Stones Rob Sheffield wrote it was "impressive to hear No Doubt summon the musical imagination to transcend the formula that used to imprison them". Stephen Thomas Erlewine of AllMusic referred to the album as "a good, hooky, stylish mainstream pop record". David Browne of Entertainment Weekly remarked that there was "something oddly flimsy" about No Doubt that prevented it from becoming a milestone in pop music, but that the band's "party-throwing skills improve with each new gathering." Colleen Delaney of Stylus Magazine commented that the band sounded like it had "growing pains" and was unsure of its place in mainstream rock, predicting that No Doubt would either become a singles band "or go all Radiohead on us and make an album of avant-jazz-electro-acid-funk-polka."

Many reviewers focused on the large number of styles that Rock Steady incorporates. Eden Miller of PopMatters, noting that Rock Steady maintains the introspection of Return of Saturn without the latter's "longing and wistfulness", stated that "it is to No Doubt's credit...that they manage to keep the album together with little more than their collective personalities." Blender, however, called it "an intermittently engaging but overall shapeless collection...the product of happy-go-lucky musicians who once cavorted in bad track suits but now spend their days commuting between London, Jamaica and Los Angeles seeking the wisdom of expensive studio geeks." Alex Needham of NME viewed the album's "enormous waterfront of styles" positively, noting that it had many strong potential singles, but found that some of the "empty-headed guitar pop" on the second half of the album spoiled the listening experience. Kimberly Reyes of Time stated that Rock Steady was able to integrate ska, pop, New Wave, and dancehall "without sounding contrived or chaotic". Reyes added that though the album lacked the energy and sales of No Doubt's 1995 breakthrough album Tragic Kingdom, Rock Steady was "their greatest effort to date...the sound of band dropping pretense to realize its potential." Sal Cinquemani of Slant Magazine commenting that "[n]ot since Blondie [...] has a rock act so effortlessly, irreverently, and fashionably skidded across so many different genre boundaries at one time." Lisa Oliver of LAUNCHcast said that "even with so many producers attempting to steer this bus along the superstar highway, they end up in a better-than-most parking lot".

Accolades
Rock Steady was ranked number 316 on Rolling Stones list of "The 500 Greatest Albums of All Time" in November 2003. Blender included the album on its April 2003 list of "500 CDs You Must Own Before You Die!". In June 2003, it was included on Slant Magazines list of "50 Essential Pop Albums"

"Hey Baby" won the award for Best Pop Performance by a Duo or Group with Vocals at the 45th Annual Grammy Awards, while Rock Steady and "Hella Good" received nominations for Best Pop Vocal Album and Best Dance Recording, respectively. At the following year's ceremony, "Underneath It All" earned the band their second consecutive Grammy Award for Best Pop Performance by a Duo or Group with Vocals.

Commercial performance

NME reviewer Alex Needham compared the album's revival of No Doubt's popularity to the performance of Madonna's 1998 album Ray of Light. Rock Steady debuted at number nine on the Billboard 200, selling 254,000 copies in its first week. Rock Steady was certified double platinum by the Recording Industry Association of America (RIAA) on October 11, 2002, and by July 2012, it had sold 2,842,000 copies in the United States.

The album was moderately successful outside the US. In Australia, it peaked at number 15 on the ARIA Albums Chart and spent nine non-consecutive weeks in the top 40. The album was certified gold by the Australian Recording Industry Association (ARIA). The album reached number 43 on the UK Albums Chart, and was certified gold by the British Phonographic Industry (BPI) on July 22, 2013. It was also certified platinum by the Canadian Recording Industry Association (CRIA) on September 3, 2002. As of November 2003, Rock Steady had sold three million copies worldwide.

Legacy and influence
When singer-songwriter Jewel released her fifth album 0304 in June 2003, reinventing and sexualizing her public image, music critics identified Rock Steady and Ray of Light as influences on the album. Slant Magazine compared 0304s retro tribute to new wave music with that on Rock Steady. Blender commented that Jewel had "brushed up on two sacred pop texts, the Manual of Madonna and the Gospel According to Gwen". The magazine compared her use of a more restrained, throaty purr to Stefani's vocals and noted 0304s use of "jumpy bubblegum choruses and boop-boop-beeping keyboards" as descendants of No Doubt's production.

Track listing

Notes
  signifies an additional producer

Personnel
Credits adapted from the liner notes of Rock Steady.

No Doubt
 Gwen Stefani – vocals ; additional programming 
 Tony Kanal – bass guitar, keyboards ; programming ; additional programming ; saxophone 
 Tom Dumont – guitar, keyboards ; programming ; additional programming 
 Adrian Young – drums

Additional musicians

 Bounty Killer – vocals 
 Fabien Waltmann – programming 
 Sly Dunbar – programming 
 Philip Steir – additional programming 
 Sean Spuehler – programming 
 Eric White – additional programming 
 Lady Saw – vocals 
 Ned Douglas – programming 
 Gabrial McNair – Clavinet, trombone ; keyboards 
 Robbie Shakespeare – additional melodic bass 
 Andy Potts – saxophone 
 Django Stewart – saxophone 
 Ric Ocasek – keyboards 
 Prince – keyboards, background vocals

Technical

 Nellee Hooper – production 
 No Doubt – production
 Greg Collins – recording 
 Simon Gogerly – additional engineering 
 Anthony Kilhoffer – engineering assistance 
 Ian Rossiter – engineering assistance 
 Sly & Robbie – production 
 Mark "Spike" Stent – additional production ; mixing 
 Dan Chase – recording 
 Philip Steir – additional production 
 Count – additional engineering 
  Mendez – additional engineering 
 Rory Baker – additional engineering 
 Toby Whalen – engineering assistance 
 Tom Dumont – additional recording 
 Tony Kanal – additional recording 
 Brian Jobson – executive production 
 Wayne Jobson – executive production 
 William Orbit – production 
 Clif Norrell – recording 
 Jeff Kanan – engineering assistance 
 Jennifer Young – engineering assistance 
 Ric Ocasek – production 
 Karl Derfler – recording 
 Juan Pablo Velasco – engineering assistance 
 Steely & Clevie – production 
 Prince – production 
 Hans-Martin Buff – recording 
 Alain Johannes – additional engineering 
 Steve Mandel – engineering assistance 
 Wayne Wilkins – mix programming
 Paul "P Dub" Watson – mix programming
 Johnny Gould – additional mix programming
 Matt Fields – mix engineering assistance
 David Treahearn – mix engineering assistance
 Keith Uddin – mix engineering assistance
 Brian "Big Bass" Gardner – mastering

Artwork
 Gwen Stefani – album art concept
 Jolie Clemens – album design, layout
 Frank Ockenfels – collage photography
 Shawn Mortensen – back cover photography
 Cindy Cooper – album package coordination
 Ekaterina Kenney – album package coordination

Charts

Weekly charts

Year-end charts

Decade-end charts

Certifications

Notes

References

2001 albums
Albums produced by Nellee Hooper
Albums produced by Philip Steir
Albums produced by Prince (musician)
Albums produced by Ric Ocasek
Albums produced by Sly and Robbie
Albums produced by Steely & Clevie
Albums produced by William Orbit
Albums recorded at Olympic Sound Studios
Dancehall albums
Electropop albums
Interscope Geffen A&M Records albums
Interscope Records albums
No Doubt albums